Mokrosęk is a village and sołectwo in the administrative district of Gmina Jedlińsk, within Radom County, Masovian Voivodeship, in the east-central Poland. Sołectwo Mokrosęk contains two villages: Mokrosęk and Gryzów.

Geography

Mokrosęk is located in the Radom Plain. A 5.2 km long Stara Błotnica - Jedlanka powiat road no. 1133W runs through the village, linking the village with the European route E77. Also a 59.8 km long Radomka Community Corporation's Bartodzieje - Uroczysko Grabina cycling trail runs through the village.

History

For the first time Mokrosęk was mentioned in court records of 1411. The village was named then Mocrosank. Another reference is in 1508 tax records. The village is also mentioned in Jan Łaski's liber beneficiorum of 1511–1523.

Demographics

Notes

References

Villages in Radom County